Tamsui District (Hokkien POJ: Tām-chúi; Hokkien Tâi-lô: Tām-tsuí; Mandarin Pinyin: Dànshuǐ) is a seaside district in New Taipei, Taiwan. It is named after the Tamsui River; the name means "fresh water". The town is popular as a site for viewing the sun setting into the Taiwan Strait. Though modest in size (population 189,271), it has a large role in Taiwanese culture.

Name

Historical
Originally settled by the Ketagalan aborigines, the location was called Hoba, meaning "stream's mouth". Hoba was loaned into Taiwanese Hokkien as Hobe. Historical works in English have referred to the place as "Hobe", "Hobé", or "Hobe Village". The Spanish arrived in the 17th century and called this place Casidor and the Tamsui River Kimalon. Dutch records have used the placenames Tamsuy and Tampsui to refer to this area but have also referred to another "Lower Tamsuy" in the south of the island.

In his 1903 book The Island of Formosa, former US diplomat James W. Davidson related that the spelling and pronunciation of the placename has been given in many variants by "as many so-called authorities. Tamsui, Tamshuy, Tamshui, Tamsoui, Tan-sui, ...". The first variant "Tamsui" is consistent with Hokkien literary readings, and (possibly by chance) is equal to the Church Romanization of an older pronunciation (Tām-súi) minus tone markings and hyphen. The variant "Tan-sui", with exception of the hyphen, is consistent with the romanization of Japanese. However, the first variant was apparently already well-known circa 1900, and features prominently in two English-language maps of the same era. Furthermore, at that time, the term "Tamsui" was used "in a most liberal way; it may mean the harbor, the river, the village of Hobe, Twatutia, or Banka, and it may mean the whole district."

Modern
From 1950 until the 2010 creation of New Taipei City, Tamsui was officially "Tamsui Township" (Hokkien POJ: Tām-chúi-tìn; Hokkien Tâi-lô: Tām-tsuí-tìn) in the former Taipei County. The spelling "Danshui" (from Hànyǔ Pīnyīn ), formerly used officially by the Taiwan government, Taipei Metro, and other sources, is based on the Mandarin pronunciation. Meanwhile, the name "Tamsui" is based on the Taiwanese Hokkien pronunciation. Having long used "Tamsui" as the official English name, the local government of the district informed the national government in 2011 that "Tamsui" rather than "Danshui" should be used in English.

History

Spanish colony
The Spanish arrived in the area of Tamsui in the 17th century. In the fall of 1629, the Spanish established the first major non-aboriginal settlement comprising the town and mission of Santo Domingo. The Spanish occupied northern Taiwan for the purpose of securing Spanish interests in the Philippines against the Dutch (who were already established in the South of Taiwan by then), the British, and the Portuguese, as well as for facilitating trade with China and Japan.

In 1642, the Spanish were expelled from Taiwan by the Dutch. The Spanish had already abandoned their settlement in Tamsui in 1638 and the Dutch built a new fort which they named Fort Anthonio (after the Governor-General of the Dutch East India Company Anthonio van Diemen). It is today known as Angmo Siaa and is the main building of the Fort San Domingo museum complex. In addition to "pacifying" the aboriginal tribes in the area, the Dutch also encouraged the immigration and settlement of the area by Han Chinese, as well as expanding the production and trade of sulfur, animal skins, and other indigenous resources.

The Dutch left Fort Zeelandia in Taiwan in 1662 following their defeat by Koxinga at the Siege of Fort Zeelandia, who continued the policy of increasing Han Chinese immigration until the surrender of his grandson Zheng Keshuang to the Qing Dynasty in 1683. In 1668, the Dutch left Keelung after getting harassed by aboriginals from Tamsui.

Qing dynasty

Because of its proximity to mainland China, as well as its location in a natural harbor, Tamsui quickly became a major fishing and trade port. The Qing naval patrol also established an outpost in Tamsui in 1808. In 1862, the Qing government opened Tamsui to foreign trade under the terms of the Treaty of Tientsin, exporting tea, camphor, sulfur, coal, opium, and dyes. By the mid-19th century Tamsui had become the largest port in Taiwan, boasting a sizable foreign population as well as a British consulate at Fort Santo Domingo.

Canadian medical doctor and missionary George Leslie Mackay arrived in Tamsui on 9 March 1872, proceeding to establish Taiwan's first hospitals in Western medicine and formal educational facilities, including Oxford College (now part of Aletheia University), the oldest European-style higher-education institution in Taiwan by some measure.

During the Sino-French War the French attempted an invasion of Taiwan during the Keelung Campaign. Liu Mingchuan, who was leading the defence of Taiwan, recruited Aboriginals to serve alongside the Chinese soldiers in fighting against the French. The French were defeated at the Battle of Tamsui, and the Qing forces pinned the French down at Keelung in an eight-month-long campaign before the French withdrew.

In 1884, the harbour of Tamsui was blockaded by the French Navy under the command of Admiral Amédée Courbet, during the Sino-French War. The French were defeated at the Battle of Tamsui by the Chinese and, according to traditional accounts, with the divine assistance of the Goddess Mazu.

Japanese rule

By the time Taiwan was ceded to Japan following the end of the Sino-Japanese War in 1895, Tamsui's position as a seaport was beginning to wane due to the accumulation of sediments in the Tamsui River. By the 20th century, most of Tamsui's port operations had moved to Keelung, and the local economy had switched primarily to agriculture. However, public infrastructure construction projects by the Japanese led to Tamsui's rise as a local administrative and cultural center.

In the early years of Japanese rule (1895–1945), the population of the city was nearly 6,000. From 1920, under the prefecture system, Tamsui was called , and was governed under Tamsui District of Taihoku Prefecture.

Post-war

Following the end of World War II in 1945, Tamsui reverted to being a small fishing town as township of Taipei County. With the expansion of nearby Taipei City, Tamsui slowly became a center for tourism along Taiwan's northwest coast. In the last ten years, the city has become popular as a suburb of Taipei in the local real estate market.

Following the completion of the Taipei Metro's Tamsui Line in 1997, the town experienced a sharp increase in tourist traffic, reflected in the completion of several riverside parks, the growth of open-air markets specializing in traditional handicrafts and street-stall snacks, the construction of a fisherman's wharf, and the increase in passenger ferries traversing across and along the river.

Administrative divisions 
Tamsui District administers forty-two urban villages.

Climate

Education
 Aletheia University
 St. John's University
 Tamkang University
 Taipei College of Maritime Technology
 New Taipei Municipal Tam-Shui Vocational High School
 New Taipei Municipal Zhuwei High School
 Tamshui Junior High School

Tourist attractions

 Drop of Water Memorial Hall
 Former British Merchant Warehouse
 Fort San Domingo
 Hobe Fort
 Museum of Tamsui Fishiegoodies
 Tamsui Art Gallery
 Tamsui Church
 Tamsui Customs Officers' Residence
 Tamsui Customs Wharf
 Tamsui Fisherman's Wharf
 Tamsui Fuyou Temple
 Tamsui Historical Museum
 Tamsui Lover's Bridge
 Tamsui Lungshan Temple
 Tamsui Meteorological Observatory
 Tamsui Old Street
 Tamsui Qingshui Temple
 Tamsui Qingshui Deity's Grand Procession, on 6th day of 5th lunar month, an important fiesta for Tamsui District
 Tamsui Red Castle
 Teng Feng Fish Ball Museum

Transportation

Taipei Metro
 Tamsui Station
 Hongshulin Station
 Zhuwei Station

Light rail
 Danhai light rail

Sister city
 Chico, California, U.S. – 1985

Notable natives
 Joe Hung, representative to Italy (1993–2000)
 Tu Tsung-ming, former physician

Gallery

Sources
 History section retrieved and translated from Tamsui District office website.

Notes

Bibliography

External links

 
Tamsui Historic Museum
Why Tamsui people are called Tamsuian?
Takao Club: The Tamsui Foreign Cemetery
Tamsui Travel Guide

History of New Taipei
Districts of New Taipei